Joe Dell (22 February 1916 – 29 May 1992) was an  Australian rules footballer who played with St Kilda in the Victorian Football League (VFL).

Notes

External links 

1916 births
1992 deaths
Australian rules footballers from Victoria (Australia)
St Kilda Football Club players